Anthony "Romeo" Santos (born July 21, 1981) is an American singer, songwriter, record producer and actor who is best known as the frontman and lead vocalist of the bachata group Aventura. In 2002, the song "Obsesión" reached number one in Italy for 16 consecutive weeks. He released several albums with Aventura before the group broke up. Since then, Santos has embarked on a solo career which has spawned seven number one songs on the Hot Latin Songs chart and seventeen number ones on the Tropical Airplay chart. Over his career, he sold over 40 million albums and over 100 million singles.

Early life 
Santos was born and raised in The Bronx, New York City on July 21, 1981, to a Dominican father and a Puerto Rican mother. He had a humble upbringing, with his father, who worked in construction, under-paid but earning enough for his family with his mother staying at home taking care of them.
Santos began his career by singing in a church choir at a young age. Romeo was exposed to Latin genres of music at a young age due to his parents.

Music career

Aventura 

Romeo was the lead singer, songwriter and co-producer of Aventura. Aventura was formed in 1994 by Anthony "Romeo" Santos, his cousin Henry Santos "Hustle Hard", and friends Lenny Santos "Len Melody", and Max Santos "Mikey a.k.a Max Agende". They were originally called Los Tinellers. In 1998 they signed with Premium Latin Music and were rebranded as Aventura.

Aventura released their debut album in 1999 with the hopes of bringing bachata into the mainstream from its traditional base and fuse it with hip hop and R&B. In 2002, the song, "Obsesión" achieved huge success in many countries, topping many international charts in France, Germany and Italy. Aventura released five studio albums in a decade, spawning many top 10 hits like internationally famous "Obsesión", "Cuando Volverás", "Un Beso", :Amor de Madre", "Los Infieles", "El Perdedor", "Por Un Segundo", "Dile Al Amor", and many others.

In 2009, Aventura was invited to perform for the 44th President of the United States Barack Obama at the White House.

In 2011 Aventura separated. According to Romeo, the group was "on pause to do individual projects". Romeo, along Lenny, Mikey, and Henry reunited to close out the second night of Romeo Santos' sold-out Yankee Stadium concerts on July 12, 2014. It was announced on December 1, 2015, that Aventura would have a set of concerts for the last time as a group for the whole month of February at the United Palace Theater in New York City. Their first concert since their split started with a sold-out crowd on February 4, 2016, with the final concert ending on February 28, 2016. On December 8, 2019, Romeo Santos posted a video saying that Aventura is going on tour around the United States in 2020 called Gira Inmortal. They would eventually go on tour until the Covid-19 pandemic forced them to cancel. In 2021, they continued the tour as a stadium tour in which they performed in 4 stadiums in the United States and 1 stadium in the Dominican Republic.

Solo 

In April 2011, after his success as a songwriter and the lead singer for Aventura, Romeo announced he was leaving the band to pursue a solo career. Romeo Santos signed with Sony records on April 7, 2011.

Formula Volume 1 and The King Stays King: Sold Out at Madison Square Garden (2011-2013) 

On May 9, 2011, he released the debut single and his first single off his debut album Formula, Vol. 1, called "You". The song went to number one on the Hot Latin Songs and Tropical Songs charts.

The second single "Promise", featured a collaboration with R&B singer Usher. As with the previous single, "Promise" topped the Hot Latin Songs and Tropical Songs charts.

He released his debut album Formula, Vol. 1 on November 8, 2011. The album featured collaborations with Usher, La Mala Rodríguez, Mario Domm from the trio Camila, Tomatito, Lil Wayne and George Lopez. It also featured bachata legends Antony "El Mayimbe" Santos, Luis Vargas, Raulin Rodriguez as they united for the song "Debate De 4" ("Debate Of 4").

In February 2012, he sold out New York City's famous Madison Square Garden three nights in a row on the 11th, 23rd, and 24th of that month. The first night kicked off The King Stays King tour which was the tour of his first solo album. On August 20, 2012, a live version of the song Llévame Contigo was released as a single to promote Santos' first live album as a solo artist.

On November 6, 2012, Santos' released The King Stays King: Sold Out at Madison Square Garden. It is a CD and DVD based on the three nights at MSG. This is his first live album and concert film as a solo artist. The live album peaked at number 65 on the Billboard 200 and at 1 Billboard Top Latin and Tropical Albums charts.

In December 2012, He sold out twice in a row at the Félix Sánchez Olympic Stadium in Santo Domingo, Dominican Republic on the 15th and 22th of that month. Santos made history selling out two nights at a stadium with a capacity of over 50,000 for concerts. This was the end of the 2012 portion of the tour.

In February 2013. He started the 2013 portion of the tour with two nights at the José Miguel Agrelot Coliseum in San Juan, Puerto Rico on the 14th and 15th of that month.
The tour would continue until July of 2013.

Formula Volume 2 (2013-2016) 

On July 30 2013, he released the first single off his second album, "Propuesta Indecente". It peaked at number 1 on the Billboard Hot Latin Songs chart. It received a Lo Nuestro Award for Tropical Song of the Year in 2014. As of 2021, is the second best-performing Latin song of all-time on the chart. It lasted on the chart for 125 weeks in which it 4 of those it was positioned at number 1. It also peaked at number 1 on the Billboard Latin and Tropical Airplay charts. The music video for this single reach over 1 billion views on YouTube. As of 2022, it has over 1.9 billion views.

On January 28, 2014, second single, "Odio", was released. It featured Canadian rapper Drake. It peaked at #1 on the Billboard Hot Latin Songs chart and lasted 13 weeks on that position. It also peaked at number 1 on the Billboard Latin and Tropical Airplay charts. This song was the first time Drake sang in Spanish.

His second album, Formula, Vol. 2, was released on February 25, 2014. It featured collaborations with Drake, Nicki Minaj, Marc Anthony, Carlos Santana, Tego Calderón, and Kevin Hart. Formula, Vol. 2 became the best-selling Latin album of 2014. In 2020, the album was awarded Billboard Top Latin Album of the decade at the 2020 Billboard Latin Music Awards.

In July 2014, he sold out an entire double-header show at Yankee Stadium on the 11th and 12th of that month. Santos was the first Latin artist to headline at the stadium. The Fania All-Stars last did so, one block south at the old Yankee Stadium on August 24, 1973. This show featured a special Aventura reunion to close out one of the nights.

In July 2015, he sold out three nights at the Barclays Center in Brooklyn, New York on the 10th, 11th, and 12th of that month. The tour would continue until August of 2016.

Golden (2017-2018) 

On February 10, 2017, He released the song "Héroe Favorito". It is the lead single for his third studio album Golden. Santos partnered with Marvel Comics to design the art cover for the single. It debut at number 2 on the Billboard Hot Latin Songs chart and lasted 13 weeks on that position. It also debut at number 1 on the Billboard Latin Airplay Chart It also debut at number 1 Tropical Airplay chart and lasted 8 weeks on that position. The music video was released 4 days later on Valentine's Day 2018. It was shot in Los Angeles, California. It featured American actress Génesis Rodríguez, who voiced Honey Lemon in Disney's 2014 film Big Hero 6.

On June 23, 2017, He released his second, "Imitadora". It peaked at number 5 on the Billboard Hot Latin Songs chart. It also peaked at number 1 on the Billboard Latin Airplay Charts, which lasted four weeks on that position, and on the Tropical Airplay chart, which lasted 10 weeks on that position. The music video was released on July 18, 2017. It was directed by Carlos Pérez and won Best Bachata Video at the Videoclip Awards 2018.

He released his third studio album titled Golden on July 21, 2017. It featured collaborations with Swizz Beatz, Juan Luis Guerra, Ozuna, Nicky Jam, Daddy Yankee, Julio Iglesias and Jessie Reyez. This was his first studio album to not be part of the Formula series. It was nominated for Best Latin Album in the Billboard Music Awards 2018.

In February 2018, Santos would kick off the Golden Tour, which was the tour for Golden, the same way he did for The King Stays King tour in 2012. He once again sold out New York City's famous Madison Square Garden three nights in a row on the 15th, 16th, and 17th of that month. The tour would end in February of 2019 with two nights at San Juan, Puerto Rico's José Miguel Agrelot Coliseum on the 8th and 9th of that month.

Utopía and Live from MetLife Stadium (2019-2021) 
0n 	April 5, 2019, he released his fourth studio album Utopía where he united with pioneers and legends of traditional modern bachata. El Chaval De La Bachata, Frank Reyes, Raulin Rodriguez, Elvis Martinez, Kiko Rodriguez, Teodoro Reyes, Joe Veras, Zacarias Ferreira, Luis Vargas, Monchy & Alexandra, and Anthony "El Mayimbe" Santos all participated in the album to show that unification within bachata is possible. The band Aventura, as a group, released an official song within this album titled "Inmortal". It was released as the lead single for the album. On the Billboard charts it peaked at 95 on the Billboard Hot 100, at number 5 on Hot Latin Songs, and at number 1 on both Latin and Tropical Airplays. Later on, the other songs from the album all got music videos with the exception of the song "Bellas".

On September 21, 2019, Romeo Santos sold out MetLife Stadium making him the first Latin artist to do so. The concert was based on the album Utopía. It featured almost every bachata artist from the album, including the other members of Aventura. Not only did each artist sang the songs from the album, but also got to sing one or two of their greatest hits. This concert celebrated the history of bachata.

In the same year, Santos decided to do a tour around Dominican Republic during November and December. These shows were free to watch and went to different towns and cities.

On June 25, 2021, a film based on the Metlife concert premiered on PPV and then on HBO Max on July 30, 2021. On August 20, 2021, he released a live version of the song "Inmortal". It's from the film and became a single for Santos' second live album titled Utopía Live from MetLife Stadium. The live album was released on September 10, 2021. It was named after the concert film released earlier that year.

Formula Volume 3 (2022-2023) 

On February 8, 2022, Romeo Santos announced that he would release a new album. It was first rumored, but then confirmed by Santos himself through YouTube and social media. It was also confirmed that it is part of the Formula series as this album is titled Formula, Vol. 3. Fans expected the third volume to have been his third studio album. However, his third studio album ended up being titled Golden and then Utopía for his fourth. After those two albums, fans never thought Fórmula would get a trilogy, until now. 

Its first single, Sus Huellas was released on Valentine's Day, February 14, 2022. It peaked at number 10 on the Billboard Hot Latin Songs chart. It also peaked at number 1 on the Billboard Latin and Tropical Airplay charts.

On July 22, 2022, Santos performed on NBC's Today as part of the Citi Summer Concert Series. He said that he was planning to release the album on September 1, 2022, which is on his first born son's birthday. He did not confirm that it would be the official released date, but he said he was working on it. On August 15th, 2022, he posted a teaser and confirmed that the official release date was going to be on the date he had mention at the concert series.

On September 1, 2022, Formula, Vol. 3 was released. It was released along with the music video for the single "Sin Fin" which featured American singer Justin Timberlake. His fans were confused when on that day at midnight the album wasn't available at that moment. Later on in the morning, Santos announced on social media that the album would be released at 11pm, which was 23 hours after the expected release time. The album featured collaborations with Justin Timberlake, Rosalía, bachata veteran Luis Miguel Del Amargue, Christian Nodal, Chris Lebron, Lapiz Conciente, and Katt Williams. It also featured merengue legends Fernando Villalona, Rubby Pérez, Toño Rosario, Ramon Orlando as they united for the song "15,000 Noches" ("15,000 Nights"). Santos included his manager Johnny Marines, requinto guitarist ChiChi and producer MateTraxx for a skit which featured a special character. He also included his 3 sons in the intro along with Williams. Santos mentioned that one of the reasons this album is his most personal one is because of his 3 sons being involved in it.

In February 2023, Santos would start his Formula, Vol. 3 Tour with four sold out shows at the National Stadium of Peru in Lima on the 10th, 11th, 12th, and 14th of that month. Santos would once again make history selling out for nights at a stadium with a capacity of over 43,000. This isn't the only time in this tour that he sells out multiple nights in the same venue.

Concert films and documentary 
On November 6, 2012, The King Stays King: Sold Out at Madison Square Garden was released on DVD by HBO Latino. This is Santos' first concert film as a solo artist. It was based on his 3 night performance at Madison Square Garden in February of 2012. It is currently available on HBO Max as Romeo Santos: The King Stays King – Live at Madison Square Garden. It featured performances by Anthony Santos, Luis Vargas, P. Diddy, Tomatito, Wisin & Yandel, and Usher. It included behind the scenes footage and clips of Santos talking about a few topics involving his life and career.

On June 25, 2021, Romeo Santos: Utopía Live from MetLife Stadium was released as a PPV event, based on the September 2019 concert in New York that featured guests Cardi B, Daddy Yankee, Emilio Estefan, Marc Anthony, Thalía and more. Concurrently, a documentary on Santos premiered on the same day titled Romeo Santos: King of Bachata which traced the history of Bachata, and showed Santos travelling to the Dominican Republic with The Kid Mero. To promote the documentary, HBO built an elaborate pop-up promotion in Washington Heights, NYC in the form of a bodega, called House of Bachata, with free haircuts, Presidente beer, and karaoke parties honoring Santos. At its center was a PORTL "hologram" device in which Santos appeared in lifelike, lifesized, volumetric 4K to interact with fans. On July 30, 2021, both films were released on HBO Max.

Musical influences 

Romeo was inspired by many exponents of music to compose his songs, among them are: Shakira, Camilo Sesto, Rocío Dúrcal, Juan Gabriel, Manuel Alejandro, within his genre are: Juan Luis Guerra and Anthony Santos.

Romeo Santos started in music when he was a teen. At first, he wasn't concentrating on bachata until one day his father bought an Anthony Santos cassette. Romeo saw the cassette and noticed that the artist had the same name as him. He played the cassette and immediately fell in love with his music. Thus, inspiring him to become a bachata singer.

Acting career 
His first film appearance was on the 2007 Dominican film Sanky Panky as himself alongside his fellow band members from Aventura performing live at Altos de Chavón in the Dominican Republic. Romeo Santos made his Hollywood debut in the film Furious 7, released April 2015, alongside Vin Diesel, Dwayne Johnson, and Paul Walker. He was nervous about acting in Furious 7 but the cast made him feel welcomed.

Santos was also the voice of the cartoon character Early Bird in the 2016 film The Angry Birds Movie.

He sang "Quiero Ser Tu Amigo", a song about friendship, on an episode of Sesame Street in 2013.

Discography 

Formula, Vol. 1 (2011)
Formula, Vol. 2 (2014)
Golden (2017)
Utopía (2019)
Formula, Vol. 3 (2022)

Tours 

 The King Stays King (2012–2013)
 Fórmula, Vol. 2 Tour (2014–2016)
 Golden Tour (2018–2019)
 Utopía Tour (2019)
 Fórmula, Vol. 3: La Gira (2023)

Filmography

Live concerts 
The King Stays King: Sold Out at Madison Square Garden (2012)
Utopía Live from MetLife Stadium (2021)

Documentary 
 Romeo Santos: King of Bachata (2021)

Movies

Awards and nominations

References

Further reading 
 Rosen, Jody. "Crossover Dreams of a Bronx Bachatero". New York Times. Arts:Music. June 3, 2009
 Symkus, Ed. "Listen to the Tale of Aventura". The Edge. The Boston Herald.com December 1, 2009
 Salsa con Son "Top 10 Romeo Santos Songs". April 10, 2016

External links 

1981 births
Living people
American bachata musicians
American male singer-songwriters
American people of Puerto Rican descent
American musicians of Puerto Rican descent
African-American male singers
American singers of Dominican Republic descent
Aventura (band) members
Musicians from the Bronx
Hispanic and Latino American musicians
Latin music songwriters
RCA Records artists
Singers from New York City
Sony Music Latin artists
Spanish-language singers of the United States
21st-century American singers
African-American songwriters
Puerto Rican people of Dominican Republic descent
Singer-songwriters from New York (state)
Latin music record producers
Bachata singers